Corinnomma is a genus of African and Asian corinnid sac spiders first described by Ferdinand Karsch in 1880.

Species
 it contains fourteen species:
Corinnomma afghanicum Roewer, 1962 – Afghanistan
Corinnomma albobarbatum Simon, 1898 – St. Vincent
Corinnomma comulatum Thorell, 1891 – India (Nicobar Is.)
Corinnomma javanum Simon, 1905 – Thailand, Singapore, Indonesia (Java, Borneo)
Corinnomma lawrencei Haddad, 2006 – Tanzania, Mozambique, South Africa
Corinnomma moerens Thorell, 1890 – Indonesia (Sumatra)
Corinnomma olivaceum Simon, 1896 – Ethiopia
Corinnomma plumosa (Thorell, 1881) – Indonesia (Moluccas)
Corinnomma rapax Deeleman-Reinhold, 1993 – Indonesia (Sumatra, Borneo)
Corinnomma rufofuscum Reimoser, 1934 – India
Corinnomma semiglabrum (Simon, 1896) – Zimbabwe, South Africa, Eswatini
Corinnomma severum (Thorell, 1877) (type) – India to China, Philippines, Indonesia (Sumatra, Sulawesi)
Corinnomma thorelli Simon, 1905 – Indonesia (Java)
Corinnomma yulinguana Barrion, Barrion-Dupo & Heong, 2013 – China

References

Araneomorphae genera
Corinnidae
Spiders of Africa
Spiders of Asia
Taxa named by Ferdinand Karsch